Ormsary is a hamlet in Knapdale, Argyll and Bute, Scotland.

References 

Villages in Knapdale